The Army West Point Black Knights women's basketball team is the women's basketball team that represents the United States Military Academy in West Point, New York. The team currently competes in the Patriot League. The Black Knights are currently coached by Missy Traversi.

History
The Black Knights began to play in 1977. They played in the Metro Atlantic Athletic Conference from 1981 to 1983 and the Empire State Conference from 1984 to 1990 before joining the Patriot League in 1990.

Postseason appearances

NCAA Division I Tournament appearances
The Black Knights have appeared in the NCAA Division I women's basketball tournament three times. They have a record of 0-3.

NCAA Division II Tournament appearances
The Black Knights had a record of 2-2 in NCAA Division II Tournament appearances in their time spent in Division II.

WNIT appearances
The Black Knights have appeared in the Women's National Invitation Tournament twice. They have a record of 0-2.

References

External links
 

 
1977 establishments in New York (state)
Basketball teams established in 1977